Pansy Potter is a British comic strip character from the magazine The Beano. She first appeared in Pansy Potter the Strong Man's Daughter issue 21 in 1938 and was first illustrated by Hugh McNeill.

Character background 

As The Beano was in its early stages of development, its creator R. D. Low published a newspaper advert in The Daily Telegraph asking for freelance artists to submit ideas for DC Thomson's new children's magazines. One was Manchester-born Hugh McNeill, who would illustrate Puffing Billy and Ping the Elastic Man. DC Thomson's collaborating process developed a comic strip about a strong girl named Bella under the title of "Biff Bang Bella", but would be changed shortly before the official strip was finalised.

Synopsis 
Pansy Potter is the daughter of a strong man, and she has dark, spiky hair and wears a short-sleeved, collared dress. Her stories were comedic with the punchlines being about the casual use of her superhuman strength shocking everyone around her.

Publication history

Original run (1938-1947)
Potter debuted in Pansy Potter the Strong Man's Daughter in issue 21. McNeill illustrated her stories until he had to abandon his career to draw maps in the Second World War. Hairy Dan creator Basil Blackaller continued the series until sometime in 1944 and was succeeded by Sam Fair for three years. Fair's final story appeared in issue 325.

In Wonderland era (1949-1955) 
In 1949, Potter starred in a new funny strip that became a full-page spread on the back cover. It was Pansy Potter in Wonderland where Potter accidentally walks into Wonderland through a wishing well and meets characters from nursery rhymes. The Beano celebrated its run by making it the first series on the back cover to be in colour. From issue 369, Pansy Potter in Wonderland had over 200 stories designed by James Clark. When Potter returned home, Clark continued creating her stories until the new Pansy Potter series ended in issue 652.

Third Run (1958)
Charles Grigg and Gordon Bell alternated between the revival over 3 years later in its 42-strip 1958 run.

Sparky appearances
In the 1960s and 1970s Pansy Potter starred in her own comic strip in DC Thomson's Sparky magazine. There were two series between issues 2 to 24, and 80 to 567. She would also appear in four of Sparky annuals.

1989–1993 Beano revival
Pansy Potter would return to the Beano in issue 2474 in 1989 this time drawn by Barry Glennard. This series continued until issue 2640 in 1993.

Funsize Funnies 
Potter returned to The Beano in 2013 between issues 3666 and 3674 in the Funsize Funnies section, drawn by Nigel Parkinson. She returned for a second run later on, where she was drawn and written by Kev F. Sutherland. She cameos in Beano 2013 and 2019 annuals, as well as in the magazine's 80th anniversary crossover.

See also
Pippi Longstocking

Sources

Citations

Bibliography 

Beano strips
DC Thomson Comics strips
Potter, Pansy
Potter, Pansy
Gag-a-day comics
1938 comics debuts
Comics characters introduced in 1938
Potter, Pansy
Potter, Pansy
Potter, Pansy
Comics set in the United Kingdom